The expansion of Greek letter organizations into Canada was an important stage of the North American fraternity movement, beginning in 1879 with the establishment of a chapter of Zeta Psi at the University of Toronto. In 1883 the same fraternity established a chapter at McGill University. Other early foundations were Kappa Alpha Society at Toronto in 1892 and at McGill in 1899, and Alpha Delta Phi at Toronto in 1893 and at McGill in 1897. The first sorority, Kappa Alpha Theta, was established at Toronto in 1887. In 1902, the first international chapter of Phi Delta Theta was established at McGill University as the Quebec Alpha. The development of the fraternity system in Canada has made great progress in these two universities. In 1927 Baird's Manual of American College Fraternities reported the existence of 42 chapters at the University of Toronto and of 23 chapters at McGill University. A few chapters were also reported from the University of British Columbia, University of Calgary, Carleton University, Dalhousie University, University of Manitoba, Queen's University, University of Western Ontario, McMaster University, Wilfrid Laurier University, University of Waterloo, Brock University and University of Alberta.

Fraternities in Canada
Chapter counts included Canadian chapters only for international fraternities. Active organizations are indicated in bold. Inactive organizations are indicated in italic.

Sororities in Canada

See also 

Fraternities and sororities
List of social fraternities and sororities
Service fraternities and sororities
Fraternities and sororities at Dalhousie University
Fraternities and sororities at Concordia University
Greek organizations at University of British Columbia
Fraternities in France
Fraternities and sororities at University of Ottawa
Fraternities and sororities at York University
Greek life at University of Toronto

References

 
Lists of student societies
Lists of organizations based in Canada